Abderrahim Chkilit (Arabic: عبد الرحيم اشكليط) (born 14 February 1976) is a Moroccan football defender who plays for Widad Fez.

Chkilit made a few appearances for the Morocco national football team, including a friendly match against Mali on 28 May 2004.

References

External links

1976 births
Living people
Moroccan footballers
Morocco international footballers
Maghreb de Fès players
Raja CA players
Association football defenders
People from Fez, Morocco